Guadarrama may refer to:

Geography:
Sierra de Guadarrama, a mountain range in the Central System, Spain
Guadarrama National Park
Guadarrama Pass
Guadarrama Tunnel
Guadarrama, a municipality in Spain
Guadarrama (river), Spain

People:
Amador Lugo Guadarrama (1921–2002), Mexican painter and engraver
José Guadarrama Márquez, Mexican politician
José Alberto Guadarrama (born 1972), Mexican soccer player
Sergio Guadarrama, founder of Celestino, a Manhattan women's evening-wear company
Sonny Guadarrama (born 1987), American soccer midfielder

See also
Battle of Guadarrama, Spain in 1937 during the Spanish Civil War
Clásica a los Puertos de Guadarrama, annual cycle road race in the Sierra de Guadarrama
Gadaraya
Guadaíra